Rajya Sabha elections were held in 1990, to elect members of the Rajya Sabha, Indian Parliament's upper chamber.

Elections
Elections were held in 1990 to elect members from various states.
The list is incomplete.

Members elected
The following members are elected in the elections held in 1990. They are members for the term 1990-96 and retire in year 1996, except in case of the resignation or death before the term.

State - Member - Party

Bye-elections
The following bye elections were held in the year 1990.

State - Member - Party
  Haryana - Krishna Kumar Deepak - JD  ( ele 23/03/1990 term till 1992 ) res 13/07/1990
  Madhya Pradesh - Dr Jinendra Kumar Jain - BJP  (  ele  23/03/1990 term till 1994 )
  Uttar Pradesh - Raja Ramanna - JD  (  ele  23/03/1990 term till 1992 )
  Uttar Pradesh - Som Pal - JD  (  ele  23/03/1990 term till 1992 )
  Uttar Pradesh - Raj Mohan Gandhi - JD  (  ele  23/03/1990 term till 1992 )
  Rajasthan - Gaj Singh - IND  (  ele  26/03/1990 term till 1992 ) 
  Karnataka - M. S. Gurupadaswamy - JD  (  ele  10/04/1990 term till 1992 )
  Karnataka - D K Tharadevi - INC  (  ele  10/04/1990 term till 1996 ) 16/06/1991
  Bihar - Kamla Sinha - JD  (  ele  19/04/1990 term till 1994 )
  Uttar Pradesh - Dr Z A Ahmad - CPI  (  ele  23/08/1990 term till 1994 )
  Haryana - Ranjit Singh - JD  (  ele  12/09/1990 term till 1992 )

References

1990 elections in India
1990